Partibrejkers I is the debut eponymous album by the Serbian garage rock/punk rock band Partibrejkers, released by Jugoton in 1985.

The album was reissued on CD in 1995 by WTC Wien.

The album was polled in 1998 as the 18th on the list of 100 greatest Yugoslav rock and pop albums in the book YU 100: najbolji albumi jugoslovenske rok i pop muzike (YU 100: The Best albums of Yugoslav pop and rock music).

Track listing

Personnel 
Partibrejkers
 Goran Bulatović "Manzanera" — drums, percussion
 Ljubiša Kostadinović "Ljuba" — guitar
 Nebojša Antonijević "Anton" — organ, guitar, percussion, artwork by
 Zoran Kostić "Cane" — vocals, percussion

Additional personnel
 Branislav Petrović "Banana" — harmonica
 Branislav Trivić — saxophone 
 Dušan Kojić "Koja" — organ, producer
 Miroslav Cvetković — recorded by 
 Vlada Funtek — recorded by 
 Stanislav Milojković — photography

References

External links 
 Partibrejkers I at Discogs

1985 debut albums
Partibrejkers albums
Jugoton albums